Victoriano Sarmientos Bios (born December 18, 1956) is a Cuban former volleyball player who competed in the 1976 Summer Olympics.

In 1976 he was part of the Cuban team which won the bronze medal in the Olympic tournament. He played all six matches. His last professional club was AONS Milon.

External links
 profile

1956 births
Living people
Cuban men's volleyball players
Olympic volleyball players of Cuba
Volleyball players at the 1976 Summer Olympics
Olympic bronze medalists for Cuba
Olympic medalists in volleyball
Medalists at the 1976 Summer Olympics